Ludwig Landen (6 November 1908 – 14 October 1985) was a German sprint canoeist, born in Cologne, who competed in the late 1930s. He won a gold medal in the K-2 10000 m event at the 1936 Summer Olympics in Berlin.

References

1908 births
1985 deaths
Canoeists at the 1936 Summer Olympics
German male canoeists
Olympic canoeists of Germany
Olympic gold medalists for Germany
Sportspeople from Cologne
Place of death missing
Olympic medalists in canoeing
Medalists at the 1936 Summer Olympics